St. Louis Strikers were an American soccer team, founded in 2003, and was a member of the United Soccer Leagues Premier Development League (PDL), the fourth tier of the American Soccer Pyramid, until 2004, when the team left the league and the franchise was terminated.

The Strikers played their home games at the St. Louis Soccer Park in the city of St. Louis, Missouri, and also at the Cooper Sports Complex in Springfield, Missouri, some 216 miles away. The team's colors were green and white.

Year-by-year

Coaches
 Sterling Wescott 2004

Stadiums
 Sportport Soccer Complex, St. Louis, Missouri 2003
 St. Louis Soccer Park, St. Louis, Missouri 2004
 Cooper Sports Complex, Springfield, Missouri 2004

References

Strikers
Soccer clubs in Missouri
Defunct Premier Development League teams
2003 establishments in Missouri
2004 disestablishments in Missouri
Association football clubs established in 2003
Association football clubs disestablished in 2004
Sports in Springfield, Missouri